Andrey Ivanovich Chemerkin (born 17 February 1972) is a former Russian weightlifter. Chemerkin was a gold medallist at the 1996 Summer Olympics, and a bronze medalist at the 2000 Summer Olympics. Andrei had a birthweight of 12,6 lbs (5,7 kg) and is to this day the heaviest weightlifter ever to win a World Championship.

Weightlifting achievements 
 Olympic Games gold medallist (1996).
 4 time World Weightlifting Championships gold medallist (1995, 1997, 1998, 1999).
 2 time European Weightlifting Championships gold medallist (1994, 1995).
 Set 7 world records during his career
 1991 - 1992 junior world weightlifting champion and a Russian championship winner known as the three warriors tournament

Andrei is the winner of the World Weightlifting Championships for university year 2000 but not a Senior Championship, and he attempted the all time heaviest clean and jerk 272.5 kg (601 lb) in the 2000 Olympics which he needed to win. In addition, he is a winner of several Russian Championships. At the time he won the Olympic Games in 1996 he snatched 197.5 kg (436 lb), followed by a clean and jerk of 260 kg (573 lb) to total 457.5 kg (1010 lb).

Career bests 
 Snatch: 202.5 kg (446 lb) at the 2000 Summer Olympics
 Clean and jerk: 262.5 kg (579 lb) (former world record in 1997)
 Total: 462.5 kg (1021 lb) (200+262.5) 1997 World Weightlifting Championships

References

External links 
 
 
 
 

1972 births
Living people
People from Izobilnensky District
Russian male weightlifters
Olympic weightlifters of Russia
Olympic gold medalists for Russia
Olympic bronze medalists for Russia
Weightlifters at the 1996 Summer Olympics
Weightlifters at the 2000 Summer Olympics
Olympic medalists in weightlifting
Medalists at the 2000 Summer Olympics
Medalists at the 1996 Summer Olympics
Sportspeople from Stavropol Krai
European Weightlifting Championships medalists
World Weightlifting Championships medalists
20th-century Russian people